The McCasland Field House is a multi-purpose indoor arena on the University of Oklahoma main campus in Norman, Oklahoma. Home of the basketball Sooners until 1975, the Field House currently hosts the men's wrestling, women's volleyball, and men's gymnastics teams. The Field House is named for T. Howard McCasland, a two-sport star who was the captain of the 1916 basketball team and an end for the football team. 

The facility opened with a basketball game between the Sooners and the University of Kansas Jayhawks on January 13, 1928, which the Sooners won 45-19.  When it opened, the facility held over 5,000 people.

It is rather unknown, these days on campus, that the Fieldhouse once witnessed concerts by Jimi Hendrix, Frank Sinatra and Elvis Presley in the 1960s and 1970s.

As the campus was constructed around the Field House, parking for fans disappeared and attendance at games dwindled as well. After the Lloyd Noble Center opened in 1975 and the basketball teams moved south to the new facility, the Field House seemed forgotten and neglected. 

Plans for refurbishment began in the 1990s along with other campus improvements, and fundraising began in earnest in September 1997. In 2005 the initial phase of a $6 million renovation project was completed, including the building's first-ever climate control system, refurbishment of the historic wood floor, new chair-back and retractable seats. The facility had to be completely rewired, not only to handle the new heating and air-conditioning systems (its first ever) and the new lighting and state-of-the-art sound and video systems, but to bring the building up to current electrical code standards. 

Finally, all of the building's windows, a distinguishing feature of the Field House, were replaced, along with the roof.

See also
Tokyo Olympics

References

External links
 Official Howard McCasland Field House information page

College gymnastics venues in the United States
College volleyball venues in the United States
College wrestling venues in the United States
Defunct college basketball venues in the United States
Oklahoma Sooners basketball venues
Sports venues in Oklahoma
University of Oklahoma campus
1928 establishments in Oklahoma
Sports venues completed in 1928